New Zealand competed at the 2012 Summer Olympics in London, from 27 July to 12 August 2012. This was the nation's twenty-fourth appearance at the Olympics. The New Zealand Olympic Committee sent 184 athletes, 97 men, and 87 women to the Games to compete in 16 sports, the nation's largest ever delegation.

New Zealand left London with a total of thirteen medals (six gold, two silver, and five bronze), finishing fifteenth in the overall medal standings. This was considered one of the nation's most successful Olympics, winning the second-largest number of gold medals behind eight at the 1984 Summer Olympics, and tying with the 1988 Summer Olympics for the largest number of medals. Five of these medals were awarded to the team in rowing, three in cycling, two in sailing, and one each in athletics, canoeing, and equestrian. Among the nation's medallists were rower Mahé Drysdale, who won gold in the men's single sculls, and track cyclists Sam Bewley, Marc Ryan, and Jesse Sergent, who managed to repeat the bronze from Beijing in men's team pursuit. New Zealand also ranked highly in medal tables adjusted for country populations, placing fourth for total medals per capita, gold medals per capita and weighted medals per capita.

During the Games, New Zealand achieved its one hundredth overall Olympic medal. The gold medal was won by kayaker Lisa Carrington in the women's K-1 200 metres. However, if the three medals won by New Zealand athletes in 1908 and in 1912 as part of Australasia were included, the one hundredth medal would be the silver claimed by sailors Peter Burling and Blair Tuke from the open skiff class.

Originally, New Zealand won five gold medals: three in rowing, one in sailing, and the last canoeing. On 13 August 2012, however, the International Olympic Committee stripped Belarusian shot putter Nadzeya Ostapchuk of her gold medal after testing positive for anabolic steroid metenolone. On 19 September 2012, silver medallist Valerie Adams was subsequently awarded and received her gold medal at a public ceremony in Auckland.

Medal tables

| width="60%" align="left" valign="top" |

|style="text-align:left;width:22%;vertical-align:top;"|

Delegation
The New Zealand Olympic Committee selected a team of 184 athletes, 97 men and 87 women, to compete in sixteen sports. It was the nation's largest delegation sent to the Olympics, surpassing the 182 athletes at the 2008 Summer Olympics in Beijing. Field hockey and football were the only team-based sports in which New Zealand had representatives at the Games. For the first time in Olympic history, New Zealand did not qualify teams in basketball since its official debut in 2000. There was only a single competitor in judo, shooting, tennis, and weightlifting.

The New Zealand team featured past Olympic medallists, including the defending champion Valerie Adams in the women's shot put event. Equestrian eventing rider Mark Todd, at age 56, the oldest member of the team, became the first New Zealand athlete to compete in eight Olympic games. Todd's compatriot Andrew Nicholson was at his seventh appearance, having participated in the Olympics since 1984 (except the 2000 Summer Olympics in Sydney, where he was not selected). Meanwhile, football player Cameron Howieson, at age 17, was the youngest member of the team. Other notable New Zealand athletes featured rower and five-time world champion Mahé Drysdale in men's singles sculls, triathlete and double Olympic medallist Bevan Docherty, BMX rider Sarah Walker, who missed out of the medal standings in Beijing, and sailors Hamish Pepper and Peter Burling. Middle-distance runner Nick Willis, who won New Zealand's first Olympic track medal in Beijing since 1976, was the nation's flag bearer at the opening ceremony.

Originally, New Zealand officiated a total of 185 athletes to compete at the Olympics. On 20 July, middle-distance runner Adrian Blincoe, however, withdrew from the games because of an ankle injury.

| width=78% align=left valign=top |

The following is the list of number of competitors participating in the Games. Note that reserves in fencing, field hockey, football, and handball are not counted as athletes:

Athletics

Men
Track & road events

Field events

Combined events – Decathlon

Women
Track & road events

Field events

Combined events – Heptathlon

Key
Note–Ranks given for track events are within the athlete's heat only
Q = Qualified for the next round
q = Qualified for the next round as a fastest loser or, in field events, by position without achieving the qualifying target
NR = National record
N/A = Round not applicable for the event
Bye = Athlete not required to compete in round

Boxing

Women

Canoeing

Slalom

New Zealand has qualified boats for the following events

Sprint

Men

Women

Qualification Legend: FA=Final A; FB=Final B; OB=Olympic best

Cycling

Road

Track
Sprint

Team sprint

Pursuit

Keirin

R=Repechage

Omnium

Mountain biking

BMX

Equestrian

Dressage

Eventing

"#" indicates that the score of this rider does not count in the team competition, since only the best three results of a team are counted.

Field hockey

As per regulations, each team was made up of 16 players, plus an additional two reserves travelling with the team but not participating.

Men's tournament

Roster

Group play

9th/10th place game

Women's tournament

Roster

Group play

Semi-final

Bronze final

Football

Men's tournament

Team roster

Group play

Women's tournament

Team roster

Group play

Quarter-final

Judo

Rowing

Men

Women

Qualification Legend: FA=Final A (medal); FB=Final B (non-medal); FC=Final C (non-medal); FD=Final D (non-medal); FE=Final E (non-medal); FF=Final F (non-medal); SA/B=Semifinals A/B; SC/D=Semifinals C/D; SE/F=Semifinals E/F; QF=Quarterfinals; R=Repechage

Sailing

Men

Women
Fleet racing

Match racing

Open

M = Medal race; EL = Eliminated – did not advance into the medal race;

Shooting

New Zealand has qualified 1 quota place.

Men

Swimming

Men

Women

Taekwondo

Tennis

Triathlon
New Zealand has a total of 6 quota places – 3 each for both the men's and women's triathlon.

Weightlifting

Officials
Dave Currie – Chef De Mission
Gary Hurring – Swim team coach

See also

 New Zealand at the Olympics
 New Zealand Olympic medallists
 New Zealand at the 2012 Summer Paralympics

References

Nations at the 2012 Summer Olympics
2012
Summer Olympics